Miracle of Flight (German: Wunder des Fliegens) is a 1935 German drama film directed by Heinz Paul and starring Ernst Udet, Jürgen Ohlsen and Käthe Haack. The film's sets were designed by the art director Robert A. Dietrich. It in the tradition of mountain films and was backed by the Ministry of Aviation whose chief Hermann Göring briefly appears in the film. Jürgen Ohlsen, who plays the aspiring aviator in the film, had previously starred in another Nazi propaganda film Hitler Youth Quex in 1933.

Synopsis
A boy whose aviator father was killed in the First World War, idolises the fighter pilot Ernst Udet. His ambitions to become a pilot himself are opposed by his mother because of her loss her husband. While on a training flight the boy is stranded on a mountainside and a rescue mission is flown by Udet to rescue him. Eventually his mother's objections are overcome to his future career.

Cast
 Ernst Udet as Flieger Udet
Jürgen Ohlsen as Heinz Muthesius
 Käthe Haack as Mutter Muthesius
 Hermann Göring as Cameo
 Cornelius Booth	
 Leonie Duval
 Elfriede Sandner

References

Bibliography
 Hales, Barbara, Petrescu, Mihaela and Weinstein, Valerie. Continuity and Crisis in German Cinema, 1928-1936. Boydell & Brewer, 2016.
 Klaus, Ulrich J. Deutsche Tonfilme: Jahrgang 1935. Klaus-Archiv, 1988.
 Waldman, Harry. Nazi Films in America, 1933-1942. McFarland, 2008.

External links 
 

1935 films
Films of Nazi Germany
German drama films
1935 drama films
1930s German-language films
German black-and-white films
1930s German films
Films directed by Heinz Paul
Terra Film films

de:Wunder des Fliegens